Ettore Ponti (26 January 1855 – 2 October 1919) was an Italian politician. He was mayor of Milan, and recipient of the Order of Merit for Labour.

References

External links
 

1855 births
1919 deaths
19th-century Italian politicians
20th-century Italian politicians
Recipients of the Order of Merit for Labour
Mayors of Milan